Patrick Wahome Gakuru (29 July 1966 – 7 November 2017) was a Kenyan politician who served as the third governor of Nyeri County having been elected in August 2017 on a Jubilee party ticket alongside deputy governor, Mutahi Kahiga. Gakuru studied economics at the University of Nairobi He had 2 Masters and a PhD from Arizona State University, USA, a Master of Business Administration (MBA) from Willamette University, USA majoring in strategy, MBA from the University of Nairobi, Kenya majoring in Marketing and a Bachelor of Commerce (Honors) from University of Nairobi.

Gakuru died at Thika level 5 hospital 7 November 2017 after a grisly road accident at Kabati near Kenol along the Thika- Murang'a road. The cause of the accident was attributed to a burst tire.

As per law, Gakuru was succeeded by his deputy, Mutahi Kahiga who took oath of office on 13 November 2017.

References

1966 births
2017 deaths
University of Nairobi alumni
Arizona State University alumni
Willamette University alumni
Jubilee Party politicians
People from Nyeri County